The R389 is a Regional Route in South Africa that connects Noupoort with Philipstown in the Northern Cape.

External links
 Routes Travel Info

References

Regional Routes in the Northern Cape